Life is a Dream is a 1987 French art film written and directed by Chilean filmmaker Raúl Ruiz. It is an oneiric,  metafictional, "neo-Baroque" work about the Chilean dictatorship, exile, dream, cinema and mnemonics. It was inspired by Frances A. Yates' book The Art of Memory (1966) and features characters and scenes from Life Is a Dream (1635), a Spanish Golden Age play Ruiz had directed at the Avignon Festival in 1986, in addition to pastiches of B-movies and serials of the 1930s and 1940s.

Cast
 Sylvain Thirolle as Ignacio Vega
 Roch Leibovici
 Bénédicte Sire as Astrea
 Laurence Cortadellas
 Jean-Bernard Guillard as Prince Segismundo
 Jean-Pierre Agazar
 Alain Halle-Halle
 Jean-François Lapalus
 Alain Rimoux

Further reading 
 Cisneros, James (2006); "The figure of memory in Chilean cinema: Patricio Guzmán and Raúl Ruiz" in Journal of Latin American Cultural Studies 15, no. 1, pp. 59–75.
 Goddard, Michael (2013); The Cinema of Raúl Ruiz: Impossible Cartographies. Wallflower Press, pp. 89–93.
 Kaup, Monika (2012); "Antidictatorship Neobaroque Cinema: Raúl Ruiz's Mémoire des apparences and María Luisa Bemberg's Yo, la peor de todas" in Neobaroque in the Americas: Alternative Modernities in Literature, Visual Art, and Film. University of Virginia Press, pp. 183–242.
 Marinescu, Andreea (2014); "The Dream of Memory in Raúl Ruiz’s Memories of Appearances: Life Is a Dream" in Framework: The Journal of Cinema and Media, Vol. 55, No. 1 (Spring), pp. 7-31.

References

External links

1987 films
French fantasy drama films
Films based on works by Pedro Calderón de la Barca
Films directed by Raúl Ruiz
1980s French films